Gregory Callimachi (1735 – 9 September 1769) was a Phanariote who served as Prince of Moldavia from 1761 to 1764, and 1767 to 1769.

Origin 
Gregory Callimachi was the son of the Grand Dragoman, and then Prince of Moldavia, John Theodore Callimachi, and Ralitsa Chrysoskoleos. He became hospodar of Moldavia as successor of his father in May 1761. Replaced by Grigore III Ghica in March 1764, he returned to his throne in January 1767.

Reign 

It was the Russo-Turkish War of 1768-1774 that led to an untimely death: accused of collusion with the Russian Empire, he was deposed in June 1769 and sent to Istanbul where he was tried and sentenced to death for treason with the Grand Dragoman Nicolas Soutzo and the Grand Vizier Yağlıkçızade Mehmed Emin Pasha. In September 1769, Callimachi is tied up and his decapitated head is exposed to the Bâb-ı Hümâyûn, that is to say to the outer door of the Topkapı Palace, with a yafta (explanatory notice) specifying his crimes.

Family 
Gregory Callimachi married Helena Mavrocordatos, from whom he had two children:
 Smaragda, wife in 1788 of Alexander Hangerli, hospodar of Moldavia.
 Mariora (1762-1822), wife of the logothete Grigore Sturdza, of whom she had Mihail Sturdza, future prince of Moldavia.

Sources 
 Alexandru Dimitrie Xenopol Histoire des Roumains de la Dacie trajane : Depuis les origines jusqu'à l'union des principautés. E Leroux Paris (1896)
 Nicolas Iorga Histoire des Roumains et de la romanité orientale. (1920)
  Constantin C. Giurescu & Dinu C. Giurescu, Istoria Românilor Volume III (depuis 1606), éd. Ştiinţifică şi Enciclopedică, Bucarest, 1977.
 Matei Cazacu, chapitre La mort infâme dans Les Ottomans et la mort de Gilles Veinstein 1996, .
 Joëlle Dalegre Grecs et Ottomans 1453-1923. De la chute de Constantinople à la fin de l’Empire Ottoman, L’Harmattan 2002, .
 Jean Nouzille La Moldavie, Histoire tragique d'une région européenne, éd. Bieler 2004, .
 Traian Sandu, Histoire de la Roumanie, éd. Perrin 2008.

Rulers of Moldavia
1735 births
1769 deaths
Gregory
18th-century people from the Ottoman Empire
18th-century Romanian people